The Louisville Formation is a geologic formation in Indiana. It preserves fossils dating back to the Silurian period.

See also

 List of fossiliferous stratigraphic units in Indiana

References
 

Silurian Indiana
Silurian southern paleotemperate deposits